Johannes Paulus Lotsy or Jan Paulus Lotsy (11 April 1867 – 17 November 1931) was a Dutch botanist, specializing in evolution and heredity. He promoted the idea of evolution being driven by hybridization.

Career 
Lotsy was born into a wealthy family in Dordrecht and went to study at the Wageningen Agricultural College where his teachers included Martinus Beijerinck and then at the Göttingen University (1886-1890) where he studied lichens for his doctorate. He then went to Johns Hopkins University (1891–1895) as a lecturer and also served as director of the herbarium. From 1896 to 1900 he was sent to Java to work on cinchona research. He returned after suffering from malaria and then taught at Leiden University (1904-1909), as a lecturer in Systematic Botany. He became director of the State Herbarium (Rijksherbarium) 1906–1909, then Secretary of the Hollandsche Maatschappij van Wetenschappen.

Lotsy founded the Association internationale des Botanistes and was editor of the Botanisches Centralblatt and the Progressus rei botanicae. He proposed a system of plant classification, based on phylogenetics. Lotsy argued for a major role of hybridization in evolution including claims for human evolution.

Lotsy died at Voorburg following a surgery.

Travels 

India (1895–1900), the United States (1922), Australia and New Zealand (1925), South Africa (1926–27), and Egypt (1930). He also studied the flora of Italy and Switzerland.

Publications 

 1928. Voyages of exploration to judge of the bearing of hybridization upon evolution (Genetica : nederlandsch tijdschrift voor erfelijheids- en afstammingsleer). Ed. M. Nijhoff
 1922a. Van den Atlantischen Oceaan naar de Stille Zuidzee
 1922b. A popular account of evolution. The Cawthron institute, Nelson, Nueva Zelanda. Cawthron lecture. Ed. R.W. Stiles & Co. 22 pp.
 1915. Het Tegenwoordige Standpunt der Evolutie-leer
 1911. Série IIIA. Sciences exactes. 1–4. Rédigées par J. P. Lotsy
 1906a. Résultats scientifiques du Congrès international de botanique, Vienne, 1905. Wissenschaftliche Ergebnisse des Internationalen botanischen Kongresses, Wien, 1905 ... Redigiert von J. P. Lotsy ... Mit ... 1 Karte, etc
 1906b. Vorlesungen über Deszendenztheorien, mit besonderer Berücksichtigung der botanischen Seite der Frage, gehalten an der Reichsuniversität zu Leiden, etc.
 1899. Rhopalocnemis Phalloides Jungh: A morphological-systematical study. Ed. E.J. Brill
 1898. Contributions to the life-history of the genus Gnetum. Ed. E.J. Brill
 1894. A contribution to the investigation of the assimilation of free atmospheric nitrogen by white and black mustard. Bulletin / U.S. Department of Agriculture, Office of Experiment Stations. G.P.O. 19 pp.

Books 

 2008. Evolution By Means Of Hybridization. Reeditado Maudsley Press. 176 pp. 
 1928. A Popular Account of Evolution 
 1925. Evolution considered in the light of Hybridization. Ed. Canterbury College by Andrews, Baty & Co. 66 pp.
 1916. Evolution by Means of Hybridization. The Hague, Martinus Nijhoff, 166 pp.
 1907–1911. Vorträge über botanische Stammesgeschichte gehalten an der Reichsuniversität zu Leiden. Ein Lehrbuch der Pflanzensystematik. In drei Bände. Jena, Verlag von Gustav Fischer. With illustrations.
 I. Algen und Pilze (Thallophyta) Jena: Gustav Fischer, 1907.
 II. Cormophyta Zoidogamia Jena: Gustav Fischer, 1909.
 III.

System 

Lotsy argued that the monocotyledons were diphyletic, with the Spadiciflorae being derived from the dicotyledons (specifically Piperales) and the remainder from a hypothetical ancestor, the Proranales. Hutchinson, who argued for a monophyletic origin, considered this improbable.

Synopsis 

Vorträge über botanische Stammesgeschichte
 Volume 3: Cormophyta Siphonogamia Part 1
 Monocotyledons vol 3(1) p. 514–564, 625–864
 Spadiciflorae p. 514–564
 Araceae
 Lemnaceae
 Cyclanthaceae
 Palmaceae
 Pandanaceae
 Sparganiaceae
 Typhaceae
 Alismataceae
 Butomaceae
 Hydrocharitaceae
 Scheuchzeriaceae
 Zosteraceae
 Posidoniaceae
 Aponogetonaceae
 Potamogetonaceae
 Najadaceae
 Altheniaceae
 Cymodoceaceae
 Triuridaceae
 Enantioblastae p. 693-714
 Commelinaceae
 Mayacaceae
 Xyridaceae
 Eriocaulaceae
 Centrolepidaceae
 Restionaceae
 Pontederiaceae
 Liliifloren p. 715–766, 792–834
 Liliaceae 714
 Melanthiaceae 717
 Asphodelaceae 722
 Aloinaceae 725
 Eriospermaceae 730
 Johnsoniaceae 731
 Agapanthaceae 732
 Alliaceae 
 Gilliesiaceae 734
 Tulipaceae 735
 Scillaceae 741
 Asparagaceae 743
 Dracaenaceae 749
 Smilaceae 759
 Luzuriagaceae 760
 Ophiopogonaceae 
 Lomandraceae 761
 Dasypogonaceae 763
 Calectasiaceae 764
 Juncaceae 
 Flagellariaceae 765 
 Stemonaceae (Roxburghiaceae) 792
 Cyanastraceae 793
 Iridaceae 794
 Crocoideae 
 Iridoideae 796
 Ixioideae 799
 Haemodoraceae 800
 Amaryllidaceae 801, 811
 Hypoxidaceae 
 Vellosiaceae 802
 Agavaceae 806
 Bromeliaceae 814
 Dioscoreaceae 823
 Taccaceae 826
 Burmanniaceen 829
 Glumifloren p. 767–791
 Cyperaceae
 Graminaceae
 Scitamineae p. 835–864
 Musaceae
 Cannaceae
 Zingiberaceae
 Marantaceae
 Orchidaceae
 Index p. 952

See also
 :Category:Taxa named by Johannes Paulus Lotsy

References

Bibliography 

 , Volume 2 at Internet Archive
 
 Nature obituary
 National Herbarium Nederland: Lotsy, Johannes Paulus

External links 

1867 births
1931 deaths
Scientists from Dordrecht
Dutch botanists